"You're Supposed to Keep Your Love for Me" is a song written by Stevie Wonder and recorded by American R&B singer Jermaine Jackson. It was released as the first single from Jackson's 1980 album, Let's Get Serious.

Record World said that "Jackson's reading is dreamy."

Charts

References

1980 singles
Jermaine Jackson songs
Songs written by Stevie Wonder